"Summer Song" is the twelfth single by Japanese pop singer-songwriter Yui. The single was released on July 2, 2008. "Summer Song" was aired on the last episode of Yui Locks on May 29, 2008.

The Limited Edition includes a special postcard of Yui with a message written by her, an original summer calendar card sticker with Yui picture on it & bonus DVD.

Background and writing

In interviews with Japanese magazines Pati Pati and Zipper, Yui said she finished the entirety of the song in 2005. However, due to timing issues, as she would prefer to release it during the summer, the song was delayed until the release on July 2, 2008. In writing the lyrics, Yui said she wanted to imbue a feeling of, "wanting to get by with my own ability", and an image of, "longing to go to the sea". She also said she wrote the song from a girl's perspective, while recollecting her own memories she'd seen during past summers.

The title "Summer  Song" was chosen by Yui as she felt the feelings in the song could be expressed through the title. Before the single, no Japanese artist has ever taken the song title "Summer Song", which was also instrumental in the choosing of the title.

Music video

The music video begins with Yui playing guitar on a wooden platform and on a grassy field, and a girl making a picture frame with her hands and capturing various scenes of summer. After drawing pool-cleaning duties along with a boy, they spray water at each other and run around the drained pool. In the middle of the video, the girl is shown holding two tickets to a fireworks festival, and quickly putting them away when the boy looks at her. At the end of the video, the girl manages to gather her courage and ask the boy to come with her, which he gratefully accepts.

The actors in the music video are the same as those starred in Yui's  "Laugh Away" video, with model Anri Okamoto playing the leading  actress and Hayashi Kento playing the leading actor. The same couple would act in Yui's fifteenth single, "Gloria".

Track listing
Normal Edition

Limited Edition
Normal Edition + DVD

Oricon sales chart (Japan)

The single was certified gold by the RIAJ for having more than 100,000 copies shipped to stores.

References

2008 singles
Yui (singer) songs
Oricon Weekly number-one singles
Songs written by Yui (singer)
Billboard Japan Hot 100 number-one singles
2008 songs
Sony Music Entertainment Japan singles